Jeanna Högberg (born 16 June 1982) is a Swedish dressage rider. She represented Sweden at the 2014 World Equestrian Games in Normandy, where she placed 6th in the team competition representing Sweden, and 39th in the individual dressage competition. She made her championships comeback at the 2021 European Dressage Championships, where she placed 5th with the Swedish team, and 19th as an individual riding Lorenzo.

References

Living people
1982 births
Swedish female equestrians
Swedish dressage riders